Solid Bronze: Great Hits is The Beautiful South's ninth album and second greatest hits compilation. It was released in November 2001 and contains 19 tracks. The album contains two songs ("Pretenders to the Throne" and "Dream a Little Dream") that were released between Carry on up the Charts and Blue Is the Colour, and never made it onto any album.

It produced one single, "The Root of All Evil", released the same month as the album, and only getting to number 50 in the UK Singles Chart. The album got to number 10.  The name of the album parodies other compilation albums e.g. "Solid Gold - Greatest Hits" by self-deprecating the popularity of the band.

Track listing

CD Single/CDEP B-Sides
As was their usual modus operandi, The Beautiful South included unreleased material on the B-sides of the singles taken from their albums.  Three tracks on this compilation, all singles, had not previously appeared on a Beautiful South album in the UK.

from the "Dream A Little Dream" CD (only available on import in the UK in 1995 - the first two tracks also later appeared on "Don't Marry Her" CD2 in 1996)
"Dream A Little Dream"
"Les Yeux Ouverts"
"Good As Gold (Stupid As Mud)"

from the "Pretenders To The Throne" CD (1995 non-album single)
"Pretenders To The Throne" 
"Virgin"
"A Long Day in the Field"

from "The Root of all Evil" CD1 Enhanced (2001 single released to promote the compilation)
"The Root Of All Evil" 
"Free For All"
"Perfect 10" (video)

from "The Root of all Evil" CD2 Enhanced (2001 single released to promote the compilation)
"The Root Of All Evil" 
"Chicken Wings" (Original Version)
"Rotterdam" (video)

Personnel

Paul Heaton - vocals
Dave Hemingway - vocals
Jacqui Abbott - vocals (except 3, 5 & 10)
Briana Corrigan - vocals (3, 5 & 10)
Dave Rotheray - guitar
Sean Welch - bass
Dave Stead - drums

Charts

Weekly charts

Year-end charts

Certifications

References

2001 greatest hits albums
The Beautiful South albums
Jangle pop compilation albums